This is a list of lighthouses in Morocco, which are located along the Mediterranean, and Atlantic coastlines of the country. It includes the two lighthouses of Cabo Bojador, and El Cabino that are in the territory of Western Sahara.

Lighthouses

See also
List of lighthouses in Mauritania (to the south)
List of lighthouses in Algeria (to the east)
Lists of lighthouses and lightvessels

References

External links

Morocco
Lighthouse
Lighthouses